Jay Merchant (born 16 May 1982 in Red Deer, Alberta, Canada) is an Australian curler and curling coach originally from Canada.

Teams and events

Men's

Mixed doubles

Record as a coach of national teams

Personal life
Merchant was born and grew up in Coronation, Alberta, Canada.  His father, Archie curled in national oilman's competitions and his mom and older brother curled as well.  

After highschool, Merchant attended the University of Lethbridge where he studied for a Bachelor of Arts in Political Science. He spent the majority of his time working in oil and gas as a labourer and then became an executive with M&N Construction in between his studies.

He was a member of then Member of Parliament Rick Casson's steering committee and curled out of the Lethbridge Curling Club. He played juniors in Alberta and made it to provincials a number of times. In 2003 he played for University of Lethbridge at the CIS/CCA Curling Championships; they were in the top five. Merchant continued to compete in men's and competed in provincials in Alberta, Saskatchewan and Quebec in various levels of the sport.

In the 2000s, he curled on the World Curling Tour, and was a member of the Guy Hemmings' team in 2008.

In 2007 the Australian Winter Olympic Committee asked him to migrate to Australia on a distinguished talent visa. In 2010 he moved to Australia to coach and play with the Australian National Team and pursue a law degree at Bond University, which he completed in 2012.

Merchant studied a master's degree in business law at Bond University. He also completed his Juris Doctor and postgraduate diploma in legal practice. Merchant currently is a sergeant of police and is also a barrister working predominantly in the Queensland Magistrates Courts.

He is a law and government lecturer at universities in Australia and abroad and has a lecture series called 'The Prosecution Rests with Jay Merchant'. Merchant also colour commentates on television, radio and is a contributor to print media in areas of sport, law, and government.

References

External links
 

1982 births
Living people
Australian male curlers
Australian curling champions
Australian curling coaches
Australian people of Canadian descent
Canadian expatriate sportspeople in Australia
Curlers from Alberta
Sportspeople from Red Deer, Alberta
University of Lethbridge alumni
Canadian male curlers
Australian barristers
Australian prosecutors
Australian police officers